Prof. Albus Percival Wulfric Brian Dumbledore  is a fictional character in J. K. Rowling's Harry Potter series. For most of the series, he is the headmaster of the wizarding school Hogwarts. As part of his backstory, it is revealed that he is the founder and leader of the Order of the Phoenix, an organisation dedicated to fighting Lord Voldemort, the main antagonist of the series.

Dumbledore was portrayed by Richard Harris in the film adaptations of Harry Potter and the Philosopher's Stone (2001) and Harry Potter and the Chamber of Secrets (2002). Following Harris' death in October 2002, Michael Gambon portrayed Dumbledore in the six remaining Harry Potter films from 2004 to 2011. Jude Law portrayed Dumbledore as a middle-aged man in the prequel films Fantastic Beasts: The Crimes of Grindelwald (2018) and Fantastic Beasts: The Secrets of Dumbledore (2022).

Rowling stated she chose the name Dumbledore, which is a dialectal word for "bumblebee", because of Dumbledore's love of music: she imagined him walking around "humming to himself a lot".

Character development
Rowling said she enjoyed writing Dumbledore because he "is the epitome of goodness." She said that Dumbledore speaks for her, as he "knows pretty much everything" about the Harry Potter universe. Rowling mentioned that Dumbledore regrets "that he has always had to be the one who knew, and who had the burden of knowing. And he would rather not know." As a mentor to the central character Harry Potter, "Dumbledore is a very wise man who knows that Harry is going to have to learn a few hard lessons to prepare him for what may be coming in his life. He allows Harry to get into what he wouldn't allow another pupil to do, and he also unwillingly permits Harry to confront things he'd rather protect him from." In a 1999 interview, Rowling stated that she imagined Dumbledore "more as a John Gielgud type, you know, quite elderly and – and quite stately." During his time as a student, Dumbledore was in Gryffindor House. Rowling said in an interview that Dumbledore was about 150 years old. However, on her website, she states that Dumbledore was born in 1881, making him either 115 or 116 at the time of his death.

On 19 October 2007, Rowling was asked by a young fan whether Dumbledore finds "true love". Rowling said that she always thought of Dumbledore as being homosexual and that he had fallen in love with the corrupt wizard Gellert Grindelwald, which was Dumbledore's "great tragedy"; Rowling did not explicitly state whether Grindelwald returned his affections. Rowling explains this further by elaborating on the motivations behind Dumbledore's flirtation with the idea of wizard domination of Muggles: "He lost his moral compass completely when he fell in love and I think subsequently became very mistrustful of his own judgement in those matters so became quite asexual. He led a celibate and a bookish life."

Appearances

Harry Potter and the Philosopher's Stone
In the opening chapter of the first novel of the series, Dumbledore arrives at number four, Privet Drive in Little Whinging, Surrey. When the evil wizard Lord Voldemort kills Harry's parents before being reduced to a lesser form, Dumbledore decides to place the now-orphaned Harry in the home of Vernon and Petunia Dursley. He knows that Harry will be protected by the special magic caused by his mother's sacrifice. He reasons that they are the only family he has left with Petunia Evans Dursley being Harry's aunt, who accepts her nephew into their home. This old magic of binding love renders Voldemort incapable of touching Harry. Dumbledore leaves Harry upon the doorstep of the Dursley home with a letter explaining the situation. He departs with the final phrase, "Good luck, Harry."

When Harry arrives at Hogwarts, Dumbledore tells him about the secrets of the Mirror of Erised, claiming that when he looks into it, he sees himself "holding a pair of thick, woollen socks." Harry later recalls in the final book that this was probably the only dishonest answer Dumbledore ever gave him. He is also responsible for somehow enchanting the Mirror so that it hides the Philosopher's Stone and only someone who looked into the Mirror and whose desire was "to find the Stone ... but not use it". The right person would receive it, as anybody else would only see themselves using the Stone due to the Mirror's special magic. He is called out to the Ministry of Magic by a false message on the night when Harry, his classmates Ron Weasley and Hermione Granger, and Hogwarts professor Quirinius Quirrell enter the dungeons to retrieve the Stone, but realises during the trip that he is needed at Hogwarts and returns in time to rescue Harry from Quirrell and Voldemort. He also has a final conversation with Harry after the events down in the dungeons and tells him that he is too young to understand why Voldemort is trying to kill him.

Harry Potter and the Chamber of Secrets
In the second novel, a younger Dumbledore appears in a series of flashbacks, seen by Harry in a diary once owned by Tom Riddle, the most gifted student in Hogwarts' history - and the future Lord Voldemort. Through the diary, Harry sees Riddle's memory of Dumbledore questioning him about a series of attacks on Muggle-born students. In the present, Lucius Malfoy forces the school's other 11 governors to suspend Dumbledore as Headmaster in the wake of attacks by a basilisk in the school when the Chamber of Secrets is opened. Dumbledore is reinstated when the governors discover that Ginny Weasley was taken into the Chamber of Secrets and Lucius is found to have coerced the other governors into suspending him.

Harry Potter and the Prisoner of Azkaban
At the beginning of the third novel, Dumbledore is forced to accept Dementors onto his school's grounds for the protection of his students from Sirius Black, a supposed murderer and accessory to murder, who had escaped from Azkaban. After Black's breach into Hogwarts, Dumbledore issues orders to close every entrance to the school and grounds. After Harry falls off his broomstick during a Quidditch match because of the Dementors, Dumbledore becomes uncharacteristically angry with them and uses his wand to cause Harry to levitate safely to the ground. Later in that book, Dumbledore suggests that Hermione use her Ministry-approved Time-Turner to go back three hours to save Buckbeak the hippogriff and Black from their unjust executions.

Harry Potter and the Goblet of Fire
In the fourth novel, Dumbledore introduces the Triwizard Tournament. He also serves as a judge during the entire event. When Harry's name comes out of the Goblet of Fire, Dumbledore is not enraged, but remains calm; simply asking Harry whether he had himself, or had asked an older student to submit his name (although in the film version he does get angry to the point of manhandling Harry). When Harry answers no, he believes him. By the end of the book, Dumbledore's fears are realized when Harry returns from his encounter with Voldemort clutching the dead body of Cedric Diggory and when Mad-Eye Moody (being impersonated by Barty Crouch Jr, through Polyjuice Potion) takes Harry away from Dumbledore and to his office inside the castle. Dumbledore immediately becomes suspicious and heads straight towards Moody's office with Minerva McGonagall and Severus Snape to save Harry and to interrogate Crouch. Afterwards, Dumbledore listens to Harry's eyewitness account about Voldemort's return. Harry though, only wakes up later to find Minister for Magic Cornelius Fudge in the hospital wing arguing with McGonagall and Dumbledore about the situation of Voldemort's return and the consequences that would follow should Fudge remain in denial of this fact.

Harry Potter and the Order of the Phoenix
In the fifth book, Dumbledore is demoted from Chief Warlock of the Wizengamot, voted out of the Chairmanship of the International Confederation of Wizards, and is almost stripped of his Order of Merlin First Class due to his speeches regarding the return of Voldemort, although it is reported that he is unconcerned as long as he is not taken off the Chocolate Frog cards. Meanwhile, the Ministry of Magic does everything they can to discredit him and Harry – mainly through the Daily Prophet. At the beginning of the book, Dumbledore enrages Fudge when he stops by at Harry's hearing with a witness (Arabella Figg) to ensure that he is not expelled. While Harry feels better when Dumbledore assists him, he becomes annoyed to the point of being angry that the headmaster refuses to speak to or even look at him.

During the following year at Hogwarts, the Ministry passes Educational Decree Twenty-two, allowing Fudge to place Dolores Umbridge to the post of Defence Against the Dark Arts teacher (after Dumbledore failed to find a suitable candidate). Through her, Fudge gradually gains power over Hogwarts and Dumbledore, who he fears is building an under-age wizard army to overthrow the Ministry. Umbridge forbids practical defence practice in her classes, forcing Harry, Ron, and Hermione to form Dumbledore's Army (a defence group led by Harry) with fellow friends. When the Ministry discovers the D.A., Dumbledore, choosing to accept the responsibility, falsely claims that the organisation was his own subversive creation, and allows himself to be removed as headmaster (for the second time) rather than allow Harry to be expelled.

Dumbledore is not heard of again in the book until he arrives in the Department of Mysteries to aid the Order in the battle against Voldemort's followers, the Death Eaters. He subdues all the Death Eaters, except for Bellatrix Lestrange, and binds them with an Anti-Disapparition Jinx to prevent them from magically escaping. He then saves Harry from the Avada Kedavra curse conjured by Voldemort and engages in a ferocious duel with the Dark Lord. This culminates in Voldemort's attempting to possess Harry in an attempt to make Dumbledore kill the boy. Voldemort is forced to leave Harry's body and flee with Lestrange after this ruse fails. Because several ministry officials witnessed the end of the battle, Dumbledore is reinstated as headmaster and retrieves all his distinctions. Towards the end of the book, Dumbledore explains to Harry that Voldemort chose him as his equal and that one must kill the other in the end, and confesses that his great affection for Harry has clouded his judgement.

Harry Potter and the Half-Blood Prince

In the sixth book, Dumbledore fetches Harry from Privet Drive and takes him to persuade Horace Slughorn to rejoin the Hogwarts staff. Harry notices that Dumbledore's right hand is shrivelled and black. During the school year, Dumbledore teaches Harry of events in Voldemort's past that he feels are of immense importance. Using the Pensieve, they visit the memories of others, which contain important information about Voldemort's life and his genocidal rise to power. While using the pensieve, Harry sees a vision of Dumbledore's first encounter with the young Tom Riddle; Dumbledore had known from the beginning that the boy was dangerous, but believed that Hogwarts would change him.

It is learned that Voldemort created six Horcruxes to gain immortality and that they must all be destroyed before Harry goes after the final piece of Voldemort's soul in the Dark Lord's body. Harry also repeatedly warns Dumbledore in most of their lessons that school bully Draco Malfoy is working for Voldemort. Dumbledore refuses to take any action against Draco, and instead tells Harry that he already knows more about what is happening than Harry does.

By the end of the book, Dumbledore and Harry set out to the cave where Dumbledore believes a Horcrux resides. In the cave, Dumbledore drinks a potion inside the Horcrux's container; while drinking it, he begins to scream, seemingly enduring mental torture and being weakened. Dumbledore begins to call out for water after he finishes the potion, and Harry, realising he has no other choice, dips the goblet into the lake to give him a drink. When he does this though, all the Inferi that reside in the lake grab at Harry and attempt to drag him down and drown him in the lake. Dumbledore suddenly recovers, thanks to the water, and conjures a fire lasso around them. Dumbledore takes the horcrux (a locket) and both make their way back out of the cave and back to Hogsmeade. When they return, Madam Rosmerta informs them that the Dark Mark was conjured over the Astronomy Tower. In the tower, Dumbledore enjoins Harry not to interfere in the events that are about to take place there, and places him in a body-binding curse under his invisibility cloak. Hidden, Harry is unable to intervene as Dumbledore (now extremely weak) is disarmed by Draco. Dumbledore is conversing with Draco about the plot to kill him, when several other Death Eaters enter the tower and try to persuade Draco to kill Dumbledore. When Draco hesitates, Snape appears and performs the Killing Curse on Dumbledore, only after Dumbledore pleads with Snape saying, "Severus . . . please...". Dumbledore dies on Hogwarts' grounds.

Shortly after his death, Dumbledore's portrait magically appears in the Headmaster's office. His funeral is attended by students, Hogwarts staff, members of the Ministry of Magic, ghosts, centaurs, merpeople and others who wish to pay their respects. Shrouded in purple velvet, he is entombed in a white marble sarcophagus beside the lake at Hogwarts, and it is said that he is the only headmaster to be buried on the school grounds.

Harry Potter and the Deathly Hallows
Rowling used several chapters in Harry Potter and the Deathly Hallows to reveal two major details concerning Dumbledore: his early life and his death. The book introduces his parents, Percival and Kendra Dumbledore, as well as his little sister, Ariana; his brother, Aberforth Dumbledore, was mentioned in previous books. At six years old, Ariana was attacked by three Muggle boys who had witnessed her performing magic. Because of this attack, Ariana was seriously traumatised and never able to control her magic again. Enraged, Percival attacked the Muggle boys (killing them in the film version), and was given a life sentence in Azkaban. After this, Kendra moved her family to the village of Godric's Hollow. In one of her outbursts, Ariana accidentally killed Kendra at around the time that Albus completed his education. Albus became the head of the family and was forced to remain in his house with his sister while Aberforth completed his education.

Soon afterward, a young Gellert Grindelwald arrived in Godric's Hollow to live with his great-aunt, Bathilda Bagshot, author of A History of Magic. The two young men took to each other immediately, and together they dreamed of a world ruled by wizards over Muggles by uniting the legendary Deathly Hallows. They believed that if they were forced to destroy a few along the way, it would still be "for the greater good", and the sufferings and losses would be rewarded a hundredfold in the end. However, this scenario would never happen, as an argument between Albus, Aberforth, and Grindelwald led to a duel that resulted in Ariana's death. For the rest of his life, Albus felt guilty, never certain whether it was his own curse or another's that had killed his sister. Grindelwald stormed back to Bagshot's home and departed to begin his own rule, leaving the country hours later. As a result of his mistakes, Albus felt that he was not to be trusted with power and, because of this, never took the position of Minister for Magic, despite being offered it several times. Dumbledore returned to Hogwarts as professor of Transfiguration, and he served in recruiting students for the school.

Decades later, in 1945, Dumbledore finally defeated the now-Dark wizard Grindelwald, who had come to possess the Elder Wand. Grindelwald's defeat made Dumbledore the master of the Elder Wand, which remained his until just before his death, when Draco used the Disarming Charm on him.

Dumbledore had another Hallow in his keeping since the death of James Potter: the Invisibility Cloak, which he had borrowed to examine. When James died, Dumbledore kept the cloak and decided to pass it on to Harry, James' son.

The truth about Dumbledore's death is revealed through Snape's last memories in the Pensieve. Harry learns that Dumbledore made a terrible error by placing a cursed ring on his right hand, sometime between the fifth and sixth book, forgetting the curses that must be on the ring. The ring held the Resurrection Stone, which Dumbledore hoped to use to allow him to apologise to his sister and parents. Dumbledore called Snape to help him; however, when Snape arrived and assessed the curse, all he could do was contain it. Snape told Dumbledore that he had little more than a year to live. After hearing this news, Dumbledore revealed to Snape that he knew about Voldemort's plan to have Draco kill him. He asked Snape to use the Killing Curse on him when the time came because he did not want Draco to have to kill him, saying that the boy's soul was still intact; Draco's soul would have been damaged in killing Dumbledore out of malice, whereas Snape was fully aware that he would be merely sparing Dumbledore pain and humiliation. He also intended for Snape to be the one to kill him and for the Elder Wand to be buried with him, in order to prevent the wand from being passed on again.

Dumbledore's spirit appears to Harry towards the end of the book in a limbo-like King's Cross, after Harry is struck with the Killing Curse which was conjured by Voldemort. During the last book, Harry finds out that he must die because he is a Horcrux. When Voldemort conjures the Killing Curse, Harry does not fight back, which stops him from dying. When they meet again, the boy comforts Dumbledore as he confesses all of his many regrets. Dumbledore then informs Harry of the choice he still has: of moving on to the next life or returning to his body to face Voldemort one last time. After returning from the mystical King's Cross and defeating and killing Voldemort, Harry has a short conversation with Dumbledore's portrait in the Headmaster's office about the fate of each of the three Deathly Hallows. He keeps the Cloak, leaves the Stone in the Forbidden Forest where he dropped it, and returns the Elder Wand to Dumbledore's tomb (from which Voldemort had stolen it). In the epilogue, it is revealed that Harry names his second son Albus Severus Potter after Dumbledore and Snape.

Portrayals within films

In the film adaptations of Philosopher's Stone (2001) and Chamber of Secrets (2002), Dumbledore was played by Richard Harris, who was expected to play the character throughout the series. Harris was not the producer's first choice, the studio initially approached Sean Connery and Patrick McGoohan for the role. Connery, who disliked the film's subject matter, turned down the role while McGoohan, who showed interest, stepped away due to his declining health. Harris mentioned that he was originally not going to take the role, since he knew his own health was in decline. He accepted because his then-11-year-old granddaughter threatened never to speak to him again if he did not take it. Harris was determined to portray Dumbledore again in Prisoner of Azkaban (2004), despite having been diagnosed with Hodgkin's lymphoma, and asked David Heyman not to recast the role. However, his death on 25 October 2002 necessitated recasting.

Christopher Lee was the producer's immediate choice for replacing Harris, but scheduling conflicts due to Lee's commitments as Saruman in The Lord of the Rings trilogy and Count Dooku in the Star Wars prequels forced him to decline. Ian McKellen was also offered the role, but he turned it down, having played the similar character Gandalf in The Lord of the Rings trilogy, as well as feeling it would have been inappropriate to take Harris' role, as Harris had called McKellen a "dreadful" actor. Harris' family had expressed an interest in seeing Peter O'Toole being chosen as his replacement. Harry Robinson, who doubled for Harris in the first two films, and who also lent his voice in the first Harry Potter video game, was also considered for the role of Dumbledore.

Michael Gambon was cast as Harris' replacement four months after Harris' death. Gambon was not concerned about bettering Harris, and he portrayed the character in his own way, putting on a slight Irish  accent for the role, as well as completing his scenes in three weeks. Gambon reprised his role in all the remaining films.

Toby Regbo was chosen to portray Dumbledore in his youth in Deathly Hallows – Part 1 and Part 2, for flashbacks scenes which provide essential information on the character's backstory.

Jude Law played the role of a younger Dumbledore in the prequel films, Fantastic Beasts: The Crimes of Grindelwald (2018) and Fantastic Beasts: The Secrets of Dumbledore (2022).

Characterisation

Appearance
Albus Dumbledore is tall and thin, with silver hair and beard (auburn in his youth) so long that they can be tucked into his belt. He has a very long and crooked nose that looks as if it has been broken at least twice. (It is speculated that his brother's punch during their sister's funeral may have played a role in shaping his nose.) He is also said to have long and skillful fingers. His eyes are described as being a brilliant, soul-piercing shade of blue, and usually twinkled with kindness and mischief.

Dumbledore wears half-moon spectacles and a colourful array of robes, ranging from purple to bright orange. He once claimed to have a scar above his left knee in the precise shape of a map of the London Underground, but whether or not he actually does is unknown. His demeanour is often – if not always – serene and ethereal, and he usually speaks in a calm, pleasant voice even when Harry thought that he is actually furious.

During the last year of his life, Dumbledore's right hand is scarred when he dons Marvolo Gaunt's Ring, which was cursed. Had Snape not intervened with a counter-curse, Dumbledore would have died much more quickly. Regardless, the curse left his hand blackened and dead-looking, and no amount of healing could repair the appearance. According to Snape, the curse would eventually spread itself from the contained hand, and Dumbledore was doomed to die in no more than one year's time. Whether this means the blackening dead-look appearance would spread throughout the entire body is unknown.

Personality

Considered the most powerful wizard in the world, Dumbledore is benevolent and wise, a good wizard in the style of Merlin. He exudes an aura of serenity and composure, rarely displaying intense emotions of anger or fear. Yet despite his benign nature, it is said that Dumbledore is the only wizard Lord Voldemort ever truly feared. Dumbledore is very eccentric and even slightly effeminate; he is very fond of knitting patterns and frequently wears flamboyant clothing (at one point, he is seen wearing a flowered bonnet). He is also known for his odd displays of whimsicality; he often uses humour to make people feel comfortable in his presence. As a supremely talented wizard, Dumbledore displays numerous examples of extraordinary powers. His abilities as a wizard are combined with a kind of cunning and subtlety of mind that allowed him to comprehend human nature and turn the better aspects of humanity (trust, love, and friendship) to Voldemort's disadvantage in particular.

More than anything else, Dumbledore has a deep capacity for love, frequently reminding Harry that love was the greatest magic of all. Dumbledore believes in the good in everyone and insists on giving second chances. The greatest example of this is Dumbledore's relationship with Snape, in whom Dumbledore is willing to place a considerable amount of faith because he showed remorse. Dumbledore is highly perceptive and emotionally intelligent; his knowledge of a person's true personality goes beyond simply being a good judge of character. This is never more apparent than in his complex insights into Voldemort's psyche, which he pieces together with Harry to deduce where Voldemort's horcruxes are hidden.

Dumbledore's appearance hides a more steely aspect, as seen when apprehending Barty Crouch Jr who was masquerading as Mad-Eye Moody:
"At that moment, Harry understood for the first time why people said Dumbledore was the only wizard Voldemort had ever feared. The look upon Dumbledore's face was more terrible than Harry could have ever imagined. There was no benign smile upon Dumbledore's face, no twinkle in the eyes. There was cold fury in every line of the ancient face; a sense of power radiated from Dumbledore as though he were giving off burning heat."

However, in spite of Dumbledore's many extraordinary qualities, he is a flawed character. According to Rowling, "Although Dumbledore seems to be so benign for six books, he's quite a Machiavellian figure, really. He's been pulling a lot of strings." In a 2005 interview, Rowling commented: "Immense brainpower does not protect you from emotional mistakes, and I think Dumbledore really exemplifies that." Dumbledore's greatest flaw, which he admits to Harry, is his desire for power. He eventually finds that those best suited for power are those who do not seek it. When he and Grindelwald first meet, they make plans to enslave Muggles and re-establish wizards as the natural rulers of the world. However, Dumbledore becomes disillusioned of this fantasy after his sister Ariana is killed during a duel between himself, his brother Aberforth, and Grindelwald.

Dumbledore is haunted by his sad family history. In particular, he is riddled with guilt over the circumstances surrounding the death of his sister. He feels enormous remorse for his selfishness in getting involved in the circumstances that led to her death, and is tortured for the rest of his life by the possibility that he might have been the one who cast the spell that killed her. When he looks into the Mirror of Erised, he sees himself redeemed in the eyes of his brother and his entire family alive and together.

Magical abilities and skills
Since a young age, Dumbledore has always shown great magical abilities. During his education at Hogwarts, Dumbledore was known as the most brilliant student to have ever stepped into the school, winning "every prize of note that the school offered", and in his N.E.W.T.s, "... did things with a wand [the examiner had] never seen before". Rowling has said that Dumbledore is primarily self-taught, although he "had access to superb teachers at Hogwarts," and, as far as his education is concerned, "Dumbledore's family would be a profitable line of inquiry." While he is not vain, Dumbledore also exhibits no false modesty, readily acknowledging that he is unusually intelligent and an exceptionally powerful wizard. He admits a number of
times to Harry in their occasional meetings in Half-Blood Prince that he makes mistakes, and since he is smarter than most men, his mistakes "tend to be correspondingly huger."

Dumbledore is an expert at nonverbal spells and is famous as an alchemist who has worked with Nicolas Flamel, the only known maker of the Philosopher's Stone, and is credited with discovering the twelve uses of dragon's blood. His Patronus takes the form of a phoenix, a recurring symbol in the books.

His knowledge of the most powerful kind of magic, love, is extensive. He taught Harry about its very essence, and the innate power of his ability to love his parents, which eventually helped Harry realise his destiny to kill Lord Voldemort.

He is known to be able to conjure Gubraithian fire (magical everlasting fire). He has claimed to be able to become invisible without using an invisibility cloak, which is a powerful Disillusionment Charm. Dumbledore is also skilled in Occlumency and Legilimency. Dumbledore is an expert at Transfiguration too, having taught the subject before becoming headmaster. He frequently creates complex objects like sofa chairs out of thin air (or from less comfortable chairs). Dumbledore is also proficient at Charms and Potions; according to the obituary written by Elphias Doge, his papers were published in journals such as Achievements in Charming and The Practical Potioneer. Dumbledore is famous for defeating Grindelwald, who is second on a list of Most Dangerous Dark Wizards of All Time only to Voldemort himself, in a "spectacular duel of legend", succeeding in doing so despite the fact that Grindelwald possessed the Elder Wand, which supposedly guarantees invincibility in duels due to its power. His skill at duelling is further shown when he calmly engages Voldemort in Harry Potter and the Order of the Phoenix, overpowering him and eventually forcing him to possess Harry to be spared from total defeat. (It is known in retrospect that Dumbledore possessed the Elder Wand when duelling Voldemort, having taken it from Grindelwald.) Unlike most wizards who make a distinct popping sound when they apparate, Dumbledore notably is able to apparate silently; the only other wizard shown to possess this skill is Voldemort. Dumbledore is known to be able to understand Mermish and Gobbledegook (Goblin language) and Parseltongue.

Possessions
Dumbledore's office houses "a number of curious [...] instruments." Among them is a Pensieve, a stone receptacle used to store and review memories, which witches and wizards are able to extract from their heads as a type of fluid. Harry first discovers this device in Goblet of Fire, and it is frequently used for flashback scenes throughout the remainder of the series. In the first chapter of Philosopher's Stone, Dumbledore is seen using the Deluminator, a device for removing and later returning light, and for use as a homing device. It is confirmed in Deathly Hallows when the object is inherited by Ron that the Deluminator is of Dumbledore's own design. Dumbledore is the possessor and master of the Elder Wand, an extremely powerful object known also as the "Wand of Destiny" or the "Deathstick", and one of the Deathly Hallows. Unlike many of the wand's previous owners, Dumbledore keeps its identity a closely guarded secret. He also has a pet phoenix named Fawkes. It is revealed in Philosopher's Stone by Mr. Ollivander that Harry's wand carries a phoenix feather as its magical core and that particular phoenix only gave one other feather, the one in Voldemort's wand that gave Harry his scar. It is later revealed in Goblet of Fire that Fawkes was the phoenix whose feathers provide the magical core in Harry's and Voldemort's wands.

Backstory
Through various interviews and discussions about the character, Rowling has established that Albus Dumbledore was born in July or August 1881 to Percival and Kendra Dumbledore. The character had previously referenced his brother Aberforth, and in Harry Potter and the Deathly Hallows, it is revealed that Albus is three years older than Aberforth. The same book introduced their sister Ariana who, at six years old, suffers a vicious attack by three male Muggle youths who had witnessed her doing magic. Frightened, they first try to get her to repeat what they had seen, and upon her failure to recreate it due to her young age, they try to stop her from being "different". The severe trauma of the attack leaves Ariana unable to function socially or to properly perform magic again. It is not explicitly stated in the novel what form this attack took, but Percival is given a life sentence in Azkaban for tracking down and hexing the boys who traumatised his daughter. To prevent her being institutionalised in St. Mungo's Hospital, or hurting someone accidentally with her uncontrolled magic, Kendra moves the family to Godric's Hollow, and conceals Ariana's illness. Their wizarding neighbours and acquaintances assumed that Ariana is a non-magical squib, and that Kendra is hiding her out of shame.

When Dumbledore and his friend Elphias Doge leave Hogwarts at the age of 18, they plan to take their "then-traditional" tour of the world. On the eve of their trip, however, Ariana accidentally kills Kendra during one of her uncontrolled outbursts of magic. Because Dumbledore's parents are absent (his father in Azkaban and his mother dead), he becomes the head of the family and it becomes his duty to put food on the table, as the family's misfortunes have left them poor. He is forced to remain in his house with Ariana while Aberforth completes his education. Aberforth knows of his brother's resentment and offers to care for Ariana himself, claiming that she prefers him to Albus, but Albus refuses, stating that it is his duty as the eldest child to care for the family.

When Gellert Grindelwald arrives at Godric's Hollow, he and Dumbledore become immediate friends, and the two dream of a new world order in which wizards rule over Muggles "for the greater good". Dumbledore and Grindelwald suggest that they have to leave the Dumbledore home to carry on their plans, but Aberforth protested against this, as Ariana's condition would not allow her to be moved. The ensuing argument between Albus, Aberforth and Grindelwald turns into a duel, and as Ariana becomes more and more stimulated, she is caught in the crossfire and killed - though neither Albus nor Aberforth are sure whether one of them or Grindlewald caused her death. Stricken with grief and remorse, Dumbledore breaks ties with Grindelwald for good. According to the author, as a result of this, Dumbledore's boggart becomes Ariana's corpse. In Philosopher's Stone, he also mentions to Harry that the deepest desire of his heart, revealed by the Mirror of Erised, is to have a pair of woollen socks, but in the seventh novel, Harry realises that he and Dumbledore see the same thing in the Mirror: their reunited families.

Reception
The character of Albus Dumbledore has been compared to other archetypal "wise old man" characters. Dumbledore acts much like Merlin from The Sword in the Stone, in the manner of an "absent-minded professor"; both Merlin and Dumbledore educate a story's main character in a castle. As writer Evelyn Perry notes, "Dumbledore resembles Merlin both personally and physically; he is an avid lover of books and wisdom who wears flowing robes and a long, white beard." Dumbledore has also been compared with Gandalf from J. R. R. Tolkien's The Lord of the Rings. Dave Kopel draws comparisons between Rowling's writing and John Bunyan's The Pilgrim's Progress and states that, among the Christian symbols that Rowling has used in her books, Dumbledore acts like "the bearded God the Father" figure in which Harry puts his faith to be saved from Voldemort and his servants. IGN also listed Dumbledore as their fifth favourite Harry Potter character, saying that "[f]or a character that was introduced into popular culture a mere twelve years ago, it speaks volumes that Professor Dumbledore has already taken his place among the great mentor figures in literature and film". IGN's Joe Utichi called Dumbledore his third favourite Harry Potter character, calling the revelation that he wasn't so "infallible" one of the most heartbreaking themes of the final book. Actor Michael Gambon received some criticism for his louder, more aggressive, portrayal of the character, who is depicted as exhibiting a more subdued, unflappable calm in the books. This has been attributed to Gambon's policy of not reading the source material from which his films are adapted.

As a main character of the series, major facts relating to Dumbledore have generated a vast number of essays and discussions. The death of Dumbledore at the end of Half-Blood Prince was discussed by fans and critics alike. A website named DumbledoreIsNotDead.com sought to understand the events of the sixth book in a different way and provided arguments to claim that the character did not really die. However, Rowling confirmed on 2 August 2006 that Dumbledore was, in fact, dead, humorously apologising to the website as she did so. Along with DumbledoreIsNotDead.com, a collection of essays, Who Killed Albus Dumbledore?: What Really Happened in Harry Potter and the Half-Blood Prince? Six Expert Harry Potter Detectives Examine the Evidence, was published by Zossima Press in November 2006. In NextMovie.com's Harry Potter Mega Poll, Dumbledore's death was voted as the most unforgettable moment in the whole series.

In the Chamber of Secrets DVD interview, screenwriter Steve Kloves stated that he considers Dumbledore a fascinating character because of the wisdom he provides, but he feels that "Dumbledore bears such a tremendous dark burden, and he knows secrets and I think in many ways he bears the weight of the future of the wizard world" and the "only way that he can keep that at bay, the darkness, is to be whimsical and humorous".

Sexuality
Rowling's statement that Dumbledore was gay caused a great debate among critics. Melissa Anelli, webmaster of the fan site The Leaky Cauldron, told The Associated Press, "J. K. Rowling calling any Harry Potter character gay would make wonderful strides in tolerance toward homosexuality. ... By dubbing someone so respected, so talented and so kind, as someone who just happens to be also homosexual, she's reinforcing the idea that a person's gayness is not something of which they should be ashamed." Entertainment Weeklys Mark Harris said "her choice to make a beloved professor-mentor gay in a world where gay teachers are still routinely slandered as malign influences was, I am certain, no accident." The stars and director of the Harry Potter films were supportive of Rowling's revelation as well. A spokesperson for Stonewall praised Rowling, saying "It's great that JK has said this. It shows that there's no limit to what gay and lesbian people can do, even being a wizard headmaster."

Some critics discussed the implications of this statement. The New York Times columnist Edward Rothstein said that "Ms. Rowling may think of Dumbledore as gay"; however, "there is no reason why anyone else should". The East Tennessee State University's student newspaper accused Rowling of lying, saying her answer was a publicity stunt. Michelle Smith quoted the Death of the Author principle, stating that Rowling's subsequent commentary is irrelevant to the understanding of the books.

Slate quotes an attendee of the book talk who said, "It was clear that JKR didn't plan to out Dumbledore. She just cares about being true to her readers." Mike Thomas of the Orlando Sentinel said that upon reflection, Dumbledore was gay from the beginning, and that this neatly explains the behaviour of his character and his relationship with Grindelwald. Thomas notes the skill Rowling displays in writing a gay character without having to put a gay label on him.

Gay rights campaigner Peter Tatchell stated that "It's good that children's literature includes the reality of gay people, since we exist in every society. But I am disappointed that she did not make Dumbledore's sexuality explicit in the Harry Potter book. Making it obvious would have sent a much more powerful message of understanding and acceptance."

Writing for Time, John Cloud, a gay man, argued that Dumbledore's silence in the books about his identity amounts to him being ashamed of his sexuality: "Why couldn't he tell us himself? The Potter books add up to more than 800,000 words before Dumbledore dies in Harry Potter and the Half-Blood Prince, yet Rowling couldn't spare two of those words to help define a central character's emotional identity: "I'm gay." We can only conclude that Dumbledore saw his homosexuality as shameful. His silence suggests a lack of personal integrity that is completely out of character."

Regarding Dumbledore's sexuality in the Fantastic Beasts series, Rowling said in 2016 that, "As far as his sexuality is concerned, watch this space".

Commemoration 
In 2011, Dumbledore was one of eight British magical figures, which included the wizards Merlin (from Arthurian legend) and Rincewind (from Terry Pratchett's Discworld), and the White Witch (from The Chronicles of Narnia), that were commemorated on a series of UK postage stamps issued by the Royal Mail.

In popular culture
Dumbledore has been parodied in several sketches and animated series:
 In The Simpsons 2006 episode "The Haw-Hawed Couple", Lisa asks Homer to read her Angelica Button book to her for bedtime. Homer, learning that the character Headmaster Greystash will die (as Dumbledore did in Half-Blood Prince), hides the fact from Lisa by inventing a happier ending, though Lisa does read the real ending and decides that Homer's was better.
 Dumbledore also stars in Neil Cicierega's Potter Puppet Pals, in which he frequently strips completely naked, except for his hat, randomly in the story. Dumbledore also tends to use the exclamation "Alas!" in an apparently incorrect place, parodying Rowling's love for unusual words. In the episode "Ron's Disease", Dumbledore reveals himself to be "a gay android".
 Albus Dumbledore appears in some episodes of Robot Chicken, voiced by Seth Green. In "Password: Swordfish", when the threat of the puberty creature Pubertis is known, Dumbledore gives Harry a stone that might help him fight Pubertis. During this appearance, Dumbledore is an African-American who states that he is played by a different actor in each of the movies. Upon confrontation with Pubertis, Harry rubs the stone two times, which summons ghosts to punch it. When it comes to the third time, Dumbledore appears and tells Harry that the stone can only be warmed up three times a day (four if he takes a week off) and that Pubertis cannot be destroyed since it lives in everyone just like his own demon Wandus Limpus prevents him from having meaningful relationships. In "I Love Her", Dumbledore tells the students that Professor Snape suffered a "minor potion accident" and has enlisted Criss Angel as their substitute teacher.
 In 2003, Comic Relief performed a spoof story called Harry Potter and the Secret Chamberpot of Azerbaijan, in which Dumbledore is portrayed by Nigel Planer, who wore the beard and costume of late Richard Harris.
 Dumbledore also appears in one of the Harry Bladder sketches in All That, portrayed by Kenan Thompson's old character Principal Williame Banes Pimpell (who appeared as Headmaster Pimpell).
 After the revelation of Dumbledore's sexuality, the American skit comedy Saturday Night Live featured a sketch featuring Rowling (played by Amy Poehler) showing "deleted scenes" from Harry Potter and the Prisoner of Azkaban where Dumbledore (played by Bill Hader) acts stereotypically gay.
 In A Very Potter Musical (2009), Dumbledore is played by actor Dylan Saunders.
 Dumbledore appears in an episode of Icons of Teen from the YouTube channel, Shut Up! Cartoons, voiced by Justin Roiland. As a teenager, Dumbledore liked to do magic and make robotic copies of himself. One day, he went scuba diving to earn his scuba diving badge for scouts. Dumbledore gets scared and stays on the boat while his crush Charlene and the scoutmaster go diving. They run into a giant sea monster and Charlene closes her eyes and says Dumbledore, a trick he taught her. Dumbledore receives her distress signal and dives in after them. He meets a talking dolphin who agrees to help Dumbledore if he can eat him in the end. Dumbledore suggests he eat the scoutmaster and the dolphin takes him to his friends. Dumbledore makes a robotic copy and sends it into the creature's stomach, distracting the creature long enough for Dumbledore, Charlene and the scoutmaster to escape. Charlene thanks Dumbledore for saving them. Dumbledore makes a sexual comment but plays it off like she said it. Charlene asks where the scoutmaster is; Dumbledore says he's gone somewhere, when really the dolphin ate him. Dumbledore then decides to build a robot copy of the scoutmaster to prevent anyone from finding out what happened to him.
 Albus Dumbledore appears in The Lego Movie (2014), though his voice actor is not credited. He is seen among the Master Builders who meet with Vitruvius in Cloud Cuckoo Land, including a Lego version of Gandalf from The Lord of the Rings.

References

External links

 Dumbledore's page at the Harry Potter Lexicon
 J. K. Rowling defines Dumbledore's sexuality
 Nancy Podcast #5: There Are No Gay Wizards

Fictional English people
Fictional LGBT characters in film
Fictional LGBT characters in literature
Fictional alchemists
Fictional gay males
Fictional schoolteachers
Fictional members of secret societies
Fictional principals and headteachers
Fictional professors
Fictional war veterans
Fictional wizards
Harry Potter characters
Fantastic Beasts characters
Literary characters introduced in 1997
Male characters in film
Male characters in literature
Harry Potter controversies
LGBT-related controversies in literature